was a Japanese baseball player who played for the Nishitetsu Lions from 1957 to 1964. His career on-base plus slugging was .506, with a high of .586 for 1962 and a low of .299 for 1957. After retiring, he became a professional baseball umpire.

References

External links

Japanese baseball players
Nishitetsu Lions players
Baseball people from Fukuoka Prefecture
1935 births
2007 deaths
Baseball umpires